1 Museum Street is a historic building in the city centre of York, in England.

The building was constructed in 1860, to a design by Rawlins Gould.  It initially served as the city's register office.  Later, it served as a Conservative Club, with committee rooms, a bar and a snooker room; it then became council offices.

The building has two storeys and is built of orange brick, with stone dressings.  It is of 11 bays, one of which curves around the corner from Museum Street into Blake Street.  The main entrance is on Museum Street, and has double doors with a fanlight above.  Most of the sash windows have four panes, although a few retain the original eight panes.  The window pediments are alternately triangular and segmented.  The upper floor has Doric order pilasters.  In 1909, a brick balustrade was added to the roof.

Inside, a grand staircase leads up to the first floor room, which contains a wooden tablet to the memory of John Hodgson, from Strensall.  The room has housed meetings of the Board of Guardians of the York Poor Law Union.

In 1986, the building was Grade II listed.  In 2010, it was purchased by the York Conservation Trust, which renovated it to become the city's tourist information centre.  The office remained there until 2022.

References

Buildings and structures completed in 1860
Museum Street 1
Museum Street (York)